Meigs County is a county located in the U.S. state of Tennessee. As of the 2020 census, the population was 12,758. Its county seat is Decatur.

History
Before 1819, the area that is now Meigs County was part of the Cherokee nation. It had been occupied for thousands of years by succeeding cultures of indigenous peoples. European trades had interacted with the Cherokee since the late 17th century, coming from colonial settlements in Virginia and South Carolina. 

Especially following the American Revolutionary War, land-hungry European-American settlers began to enter this territory in greater number.  They established ferries across the Tennessee River from Rhea County as early as 1807. Colonel Return J. Meigs, a Revolutionary veteran and namesake for the county, was appointed as the United States Indian agent, based in Rhea County until 1817. He supervised trade with the Cherokee. That year, the agency was moved to an area in what is now Meigs County. 

In 1819, the US made what is known as the Calhoun Treaty with the Cherokee, forcing them to cede lands north of the Hiwassee River for European-American settlement. Meigs County was formed by the Tennessee legislature in 1836 from parts of Rhea County.

In 1830 Congress passed the Indian Removal Act, and the US started forcibly removing the Five Civilized Tribes from the Southeast. The Cherokee were the last to go. They were gathered in internment camps in Tennessee and Alabama before being forced on the long overland journey to Indian Territory, known as the "Trail of Tears." Many crossed the Tennessee River at Blythe Ferry, in the southwestern part of Meigs County.

In June 1861, at the outbreak of the Civil War, the people of Meigs County were among the few in East Tennessee to vote in favor of Tennessee's Ordinance of Secession. The county voted 481 to 267 in favor of the Ordinance, which severed the state's ties to the Union. The county provided troops for both sides during the course of the war.

20th century to present
In 1985, the Meigs County Family and Community Education ("FCE") Club began a large quilt to commemorate the early history of Meigs County as part of Tennessee's 1986 Homecoming celebrations.  It includes images of fourteen sites representing the early history of Meigs County.  The central quilt design, including a map to locate the sites represented, was made by the late Flossie Bennett, a longtime leader of the FCE. A committee of representatives from Ten Mile, Peakland, Concord, Goodfield, and Decatur, decided which sites would be included.  

These were the Elisha Sharp House (now the Sharp-Wasson-Worth House, c. 1825), the Stewart House (1830), R. H. Johnson's stable, Mount Zion church and Cemetery (1830), Zeigler's Mill (1850, previously called Gettys Mill), the Washington Ferry (1808), Pisgah Church (1818), the old gymnasium (c. 1822), the old Meigs County Courthouse (1904), the old Volunteer Electric Cooperative Building (1935), the Ashley House (1885), and the Sam Eaves Store (c. 1861). The quilt also included Hereford cattle, since Meigs County is noted for its beef cattle.  

The quilt was awarded "Best Original Design" at the McMinn County Living Heritage Museum's Quilt Show. Initially displayed at the Meigs-Decatur Public Library, the quilt now hangs in the Meigs County Historical Museum in Decatur.

A new building was constructed in Decatur to house the collection of the Meigs County Historical Museum. It opened in July 2002. The Meigs County Historical Museum houses many court and family records. On permanent display is a mural depicting Main Street in Decatur in the 1930s. The mural was funded by grants from the Tennessee Arts Commission and the VEC Customer shares program. It was painted by local artist Bill McDonald.

Geography

The main geographic feature of Meigs County is the Tennessee River, which forms the county's western boundary. Watts Bar Dam is located along the river between Meigs and adjacent Rhea County. Above it is the manmade Watts Bar Lake, which spans the river upstream to Fort Loudoun Dam just west of Knoxville. Watts Bar Dam's tailwaters are part of Chickamauga Lake, which stretches downstream to Chickamauga Dam in Chattanooga.  The mouth of the Hiwassee River flows into the Tennessee River at a point in southwestern Meigs County, near where Meigs, Rhea, and Hamilton counties meet.

Adjacent counties
Roane County, Tennessee (north)
McMinn County, Tennessee (east)
Bradley County, Tennessee (southeast)
Hamilton County, Tennessee (south)
Rhea County, Tennessee (west)

State protected areas
Chickamauga Wildlife Management Area (part)
Hiwassee Refuge (part)

Demographics

2020 census

As of the 2020 United States census, there were 12,758 people, 4,938 households, and 3,331 families residing in the county.

2000 census
As of the census of 2000, there were 11,086 people, 4,304 households, and 3,262 families residing in the county. The population density was 57 people per square mile (22/km2). There were 5,188 housing units at an average density of 27 per square mile (10/km2). The racial makeup of the county was 97.65% White, 1.24% Black or African American, 0.21% Native American, 0.18% Asian, 0.11% from other races, and 0.60% from two or more races. 0.57% of the population were Hispanic or Latino of any race.

There were 4,304 households, out of which 32.80% had children under the age of 18 living with them, 61.70% were married couples living together, 9.90% had a female householder with no husband present, and 24.20% were non-families. 20.80% of all households were made up of individuals, and 7.80% had someone living alone who was 65 years of age or older. The average household size was 2.55 and the average family size was 2.94.

In the county, the population was spread out, with 25.10% under the age of 18, 8.10% from 18 to 24, 28.90% from 25 to 44, 26.30% from 45 to 64, and 11.50% who were 65 years of age or older. The median age was 37 years. For every 100 females there were 100.00 males. For every 100 females age 18 and over, there were 97.30 males.

The median income for a household in the county was $29,354, and the median income for a family was $34,114. Males had a median income of $29,521 versus $20,419 for females. The per capita income for the county was $14,551. About 15.80% of families and 18.30% of the population were below the poverty line, including 23.50% of those under age 18 and 14.60% of those age 65 or over.

Transportation
State Route 58 - The principal north–south highway, runs the entire length of the county dividing the county down the middle. The only link via the Hiwassee River Bridge to the southernmost part of the county.

State Route 30 - The principal east–west highway. This highway divides the county into north and south and intersects Highway 58 in Decatur. The Tennessee Department of Transportation is in the process of upgrading Highway 30 from a 2-lane highway to a 4-lane divided highway. allowing for more major east–west traffic and faster connection to Interstate 75. (The section from Decatur eastward was finished in 2008.)

State Route 68 - A north–south main highway for the county, that actually runs east/west through the northern county. This highway crosses the Tennessee River at Watts Bar Dam.

State Route 60 - A principal north–south highway forming the southern border of the county.

State Route 304 - An important local road, mainly for local residents that live off of the highway, and its northern portions allows access to Watts Bar Lake's many marinas, resorts, and campgrounds. Also connects the unincorporated community of Ten Mile with the county seat of Decatur.

State Route 305 - An important local road, connecting Interstate 75 with Tennessee State Route 68 and Tennessee State Route 58. This also connects the north-central part of the county with the neighboring city of Athens in McMinn County.

State Route 306 - A secondary state highway in the southeast portion of the county connecting Highway 58 to Charleston and Cleveland.

Communities

Town
Decatur (county seat)

Unincorporated communities
Big Spring
Birchwood (partial)
 Euchee
Georgetown (partial)
Ten Mile (partial)

Ghost town
Cute

Politics

See also
National Register of Historic Places listings in Meigs County, Tennessee

Notes

References

External links

 Meigs County-Decatur Chamber of Commerce
 Meigs County, TNGenWeb - free genealogy resources for the county

 
1836 establishments in Tennessee
Populated places established in 1836
Counties of Appalachia
East Tennessee